Jammin' in Hi Fi with Gene Ammons (also rereleased as The Twister) is an album by saxophonist Gene Ammons recorded in 1957 and released on the Prestige label.

Reception

Allmusic reviewer Scott Yanow stated: "Tenorman Gene Ammons headed a series of notable studio jam session in the 1950s and this is one of the better ones... The results are an accessible and often exciting brand of bebop".

Track listing 
 "The Twister" (Mal Waldron) - 12:15     
 "Four" (Miles Davis) - 13:02     
 "Pennies from Heaven" (Johnny Burke, Arthur Johnston) - 13:02     
 "Cattin'" (Waldron) - 11:58

Personnel 
Gene Ammons - tenor saxophone
Idrees Sulieman - trumpet
Jackie McLean - alto saxophone
Mal Waldron - piano
Kenny Burrell - guitar
Paul Chambers - bass
Art Taylor - drums

References 

Gene Ammons albums
1957 albums
Prestige Records albums
Albums recorded at Van Gelder Studio
Albums produced by Bob Weinstock